Mode for Joe is the fifth studio album by American jazz saxophonist Joe Henderson, recorded and released in 1966. Featuring Henderson with a larger than usual ensemble consisting of trumpeter Lee Morgan, trombonist Curtis Fuller, vibraphonist Bobby Hutcherson, pianist Cedar Walton, bassist Ron Carter and drummer Joe Chambers. It was Henderson’s last Blue Note recording as leader until the live albums The State of the Tenor, Vols. 1 & 2 almost 20 years later.

Reception 

AllMusic reviewer Eric Starr awarded the album 4.5 stars, calling it "a great example of modern jazz at its best" and "one of the sax legend's most intriguing albums."

Track listing 
All compositions by Joe Henderson, except where indicated.

"A Shade of Jade" – 7:08
"Mode for Joe" (Cedar Walton) – 8:00
"Black" (Walton) – 6:51
"Caribbean Fire Dance" – 6:41
"Granted" – 7:20
"Free Wheelin'" (Lee Morgan) – 6:39
"Black" (Walton) [Alternate Take] – 6:48 Bonus track on CD

Personnel
 Joe Henderson – tenor saxophone
 Lee Morgan – trumpet
 Curtis Fuller – trombone
 Bobby Hutcherson – vibraphone
 Cedar Walton – piano
 Ron Carter – bass
 Joe Chambers – drums

References

Joe Henderson albums
Blue Note Records albums
1966 albums
Albums produced by Alfred Lion
Albums recorded at Van Gelder Studio